Lake Providence is a town in, and the parish seat of, East Carroll Parish in northeastern Louisiana. The population was 5,104 at the 2000 census and declined by 21.8 percent to 3,991 in 2010. The town's poverty rate is approximately 55 percent; the average median household income is $16,500, and the average age is 31.

The town shares its name with the oxbow lake of the Mississippi River, also called Lake Providence. This area was historically developed as cotton plantations before and after the Civil War, and remains largely rural. The Union Army developed a supply depot near the lake during the Civil War, and its camp was crowded with refugee slaves seeking their freedom. The town grew larger at this site.

History
In the late 18th century goods such as animal pelts, indigo, and cotton were transported on the Mississippi River by people commonly known as longboat men, named for the type of craft that carried the goods. These were eventually replaced by steamboats. Thieves and pirates raided the longboats, killing the crew and selling the goods. Bunch's Bend is named for a pirate who would raid the boats at this place, where they had to maneuver the bend in the river. If the longboat men made it past Bunch's Bend without being robbed, they would say they, "made it to Providence."

The trading town of Providence developed at the bend. It later was renamed as Lake Providence when the town was moved to its current location surrounding a natural oxbow lake. The Lake Providence area first opened for European-American settlement in the late 1830s, after the federal government enforced Indian Removal to Indian Territory further west of the Mississippi River, and extinguished their land titles. Settlers drained the cypress swamps along the Mississippi River and used enslaved African Americans to clear the land for cultivation.

Civil War
By the start of the American Civil War in 1861, the region consisted mostly of large cotton plantations along the river, which were worked by thousands of slave laborers.

The town of Lake Providence developed after the arrival of the Union Army in the spring of 1862. Under the direction of General Ulysses S. Grant, the area by Lake Providence was established as a supply depot and base of operations for the Vicksburg Campaign. The soldiers dug a canal between the Mississippi River and Lake Providence. The area was called "Soldiers' Rest". Grant subsequently moved his troops south for  temporary residence at Winter Quarters south of Newellton in Tensas Parish. As slaves crowded into the camp at Lake Providence to gain freedom from surrounding plantations, the population quickly soared from a few hundred to several thousand.  What began as a simple military supply camp quickly transformed into a city with a large population of African-American refugees.

By the time Vicksburg, Mississippi fell to the Union in 1863, most planters in the Lake Providence area had fled, and their plantations lay empty. The Union Army determined that they should be productive again.

20th century

After white Democrats regained power in the state legislature after the Reconstruction Era, they worked to reimpose white supremacy. Many blacks worked as sharecroppers or tenant farmers in the region. In 1898, Louisiana, like other southern states, enacted a new constitution, designed to maintain Democratic Party dominance and forestall any alliances such as the Populist-Republican alliance that had won seats in the 1890s. They included provisions that raised barriers to voter registration and elections, effectively disfranchising most blacks despite their constitutional 15th Amendment right to vote. Their exclusion from the political system made them second-class citizens.

The civil rights movement of the post-World War II period from the 1940s through the 1960s brought efforts of a new generation to make constitutional rights more equitable. Until 1962, no African Americans had been allowed to register to vote in Lake Providence or East Carroll Parish in forty years when U.S. District Judge Edwin Ford Hunter, Jr., based in Lake Charles in the far southwestern corner of the state, personally registered twenty-eight African Americans in Lake Providence under a provision of the Civil Rights Act of 1960, which had been signed into law by U.S. President Dwight D. Eisenhower. Hunter was challenged by Louisiana 6th Judicial District Judge Frank Voelker Sr., who was based in Lake Providence, in a dispute over the powers of the national government. The case attracted national attention, as the civil rights movement highlighted the constitutional infringement of the rights of African Americans in the South.

Following national Democratic support for the passage of civil rights legislation in the mid-1960s, most African Americans allied with that party. With a majority African-American electorate, Lake Providence voters in the 21st century continue to support Democratic Party candidates. Conservative whites tended to leave the Democratic Party after the 1960s, and have overwhelmingly joined the Republican Party. In the 2008 and 2012 presidential elections, East Carroll Parish voted handily for Democrat Barack H. Obama of Illinois, rather than his Republican opponents, John McCain of Arizona and Mitt Romney of Massachusetts.

Geography

 
The existing boundaries of the town constitute the third location of the community. Lake Providence is located adjacent to the Mississippi River. Prior to the building of the current levee system by the United States Army Corps of Engineers, the meandering river would overflow its bank and take valuable lands. It was such flooding that the lake of Lake Providence was created and the town was washed away by the river. Each time the town was taken by the river, the citizens moved.

Historian John D. Winters describes Lake Providence as "a beautiful oxbow lake some six miles (10 km) long, an old Mississippi river bed with an outlet through Baxter Bayou into Bayou Macon and thus into the Tensas, Ouachita, Black, and Red rivers.

Demographics

As of the 2020 United States census, there were 3,587 people, 1,221 households, and 695 families residing in the town.

Education
Public schools operated by the East Carroll Parish School Board include Southside Elementary School (PK-5), Lake Providence Junior High School (grades 6-8), and Lake Providence Senior High School (9-12).  The private school Briarfield Academy is grades PK to 12.

Representation in other media
Several episodes of the 1959 NBC television series Riverboat, starring Darren McGavin, deal with pirates on the Mississippi River or the shipment of cotton. It is set in the middle 19th century, rather than the 18th.

Notable people

 Vivien Theodore Thomas, an American laboratory supervisor who developed a procedure used to treat blue baby syndrome (now known as cyanotic heart disease) in the 1940s. The successful performance of the blue baby operation placed Johns Hopkins on the global map and opened the door for cardiac surgery, nationally and internationally. 

Something the Lord Made is a 2004 American made-for-television biographical drama film about cardiac pioneer Vivien Thomas.

 Clifford Cleveland Brooks, planter in St. Joseph, represented East Carroll Parish in the state senate from 1924 to 1932.
 William Denis Brown, III, attorney, businessman, and state senator from Ouachita Parish; floor leader in first term of Governor Edwin Washington Edwards; reared on plantation north of Lake Providence.  
 Vail M. Delony, state representative from East Carroll Parish, 1940–1967; Speaker of the Louisiana House, 1964–1967.
 John Martin Hamley (or John Martian Hamley), state representative, 1912–1924; clerk of the state House, 1924–1931; elected parish tax assessor, 1933.
 William J. Jefferson, former U.S. representative from Louisiana's 2nd congressional district; convicted felon.
 Joseph Kerr, U.S. Senator; moved to Lake Providence as an adult.  Kerr's son, Joseph Kerr Jr., was born at Lake Providence, and died in the Battle of the Alamo.
 Francis Xavier Ransdell, judge of the Louisiana 6th Judicial District from 1900 to 1936.
 Joseph E. Ransdell, Lake Providence lawyer and planter; former member of the United States House of Representatives and three-term U.S. Senator.
 John Henry Scott, native of Lake Providence who worked for voting and civil rights for African Americans in Louisiana
 David Ransdell Voelker, Lake Providence native, entrepreneur and philanthropist in New Orleans. 
 Frank Voelker, Jr., Lake Providence city attorney, 1950–1962; chairman of the Louisiana State Sovereignty Commission, 1962–1963; candidate for governor in 1963.
 Frank Voelker Sr., attorney and 6th Judicial District Court judge, 1937–1963
 Norris C. Williamson, state senator from the Delta parishes from 1916 to 1932
 Edith Wilmans, first woman elected to the Texas State Legislature
John D. Winters, Civil War historian 
 Captan Jack Wyly, Democratic politician and Lake Providence lawyer; convicted felon.
 Charles and Sam Wyly , billionaire entrepreneur brothers, founders of Uccel, Sterling Software, and Green Mountain Energy; the Tower of Learning at Louisiana Tech University in Ruston is named in honor of Charles Wyly.
 Aaron "Rudy" Threats, the longest serving Chief of Police in the history of Lake Providence, the parish seat of East Carroll Parish.

References

External links

 Town of Lake Providence Official Government Website for the Town of Lake Providence, LA
 Lake Providence Progress Community Progress Site for Lake Providence, LA

Towns in East Carroll Parish, Louisiana
Towns in Louisiana
Louisiana populated places on the Mississippi River
Parish seats in Louisiana